Womb (stylized in all caps) is the third studio album by Canadian electronic music duo Purity Ring. It was released through 4AD on April 3, 2020. It was preceded by the lead single "Stardew". The duo was scheduled to tour North America in support of the album from May to September 2020, but it was postponed to 2021 due to the COVID-19 lockdowns.

Background
Prior to the announcement of the album, the duo launched a website containing a hidden maze that revealed the song "Pink Lightning". A press release stated that the album "chronicles a quest for comfort and the search for a resting place in a world where so much is beyond our control".

Track listing

Note
  The LP version includes a 50 second bonus "hidden" track on the B-side after "Stardew".

Personnel
Purity Ring
 Megan James – vocals, 
 Corin Roddick – production, mixing, engineering

Additional personnel
 Greg Calbi – mastering
 Steve Fallone – mastering
 Cecil Frena – engineering
 Eric Cheng – engineering
 Murray Nelson – artwork
 Chris Svensson – graphic design
 Tallulah Fontaine – illustrations

Charts

References

2020 albums
4AD albums
Purity Ring (band) albums